This is a list of the 13 observers to the European Parliament for Lithuania in the 1999 to 2004 session. They were appointed by the Lithuanian Parliament as observers from 1 May 2003 until the accession of Lithuania to the EU on 1 May 2004.

List

Sources
 (in Lithuanian)

Lithuania
2003
Lithuania